On Stage Vol. 2 is a live album by saxophonist Clifford Jordan which was recorded in Holland in 1975 and first released on the SteepleChase label in 1978.

Reception

In his review on Allmusic, Ken Dryden states that "The second of three volumes recorded in 1975 featuring tenorist Clifford Jordan with Cedar Walton, Sam Jones, and Billy Higgins finds the quartet in top form".

Track listing 
 "Midnight Waltz" (Cedar Walton) - 15:59   
 "Bleecker Street Theme" (Walton) - 1:05   
 "I Should Care" (Sammy Cahn, Axel Stordahl, Paul Weston) - 10:09   
 "Stella by Starlight" (Ned Washington, Victor Young) - 10:25   
 "Alias Buster Henry" (Billy Higgins) - 4:42 Bonus track on CD reissue

Personnel 
Clifford Jordan - tenor saxophone
Cedar Walton - piano
Sam Jones - bass
Billy Higgins - drums

References 

Clifford Jordan live albums
1978 live albums
SteepleChase Records live albums